DeKalb County is a county in the U.S. state of Indiana. As of the 2020 United States Census, the population was 43,265. The county seat is Auburn.

History
On 7 February 1835, the Indiana State Legislature passed an omnibus bill that authorized the creation of thirteen counties in northeast Indiana on previously unorganized land (including the recent Wabash New Purchase). The organization of the county's government commenced in 1837. It was named for General Johann de Kalb, a Continental Army officer from Bavaria, who was killed at the Battle of Camden in South Carolina. The first settlers in the future DeKalb County were from New England, settling what was then known as the Northwest Territory. These people were "Yankee" migrants, descended from the English Puritans who settled New England in the colonial era. In the 1870s immigrants from Ireland and Germany began arriving in DeKalb County, in large numbers.

Geography
DeKalb County lies on the east side of Indiana; its east border abuts the western border of Ohio. Its low, rolling terrain is entirely devoted to agriculture or urban development. The Saint Joseph River flows southwestward through the SE portion of the county, while the western part of the county is drained by Cedar Creek.

Adjacent counties

 LaGrange County - northwest
 Steuben County - north
 Williams County, Ohio - northeast
 Defiance County, Ohio - southeast
 Allen County - south
 Noble County - west

Cities and towns

 Altona
 Ashley
 Auburn (county seat) 
 Butler
 Corunna
 Garrett
 Hamilton
 Saint Joe
 Waterloo

Unincorporated communities

 Artic
 Auburn Junction
 Butler Center
 Cedar
 Concord
 Fairfield Center
 Hopewell
 Moore
 New Era
 Newville
 Orangeville
 Saint Johns
 Sedan
 Spencerville
 Stafford Center
 Summit
 Taylor Corner

Townships

 Butler
 Concord
 Fairfield
 Franklin
 Grant
 Jackson
 Keyser
 Newville
 Richland
 Smithfield
 Spencer
 Stafford
 Troy
 Union
 Wilmington

Major highways

  Interstate 69
  U.S. Route 6
  State Road 1
  State Road 3
  State Road 4
  State Road 8
  State Road 101
  State Road 205
  State Road 327
  State Road 427

Climate and weather

Government

The county government is a constitutional body, granted specific powers by the Constitution of Indiana and the Indiana Code.

County Council: The fiscal branch of the county government; controls spending and revenue collection in the county. Representatives are elected to four-year terms from county districts. They are responsible for setting salaries, the annual budget, and special spending. The council also has limited authority to impose local taxes, in the form of an income and property tax that is subject to state level approval, excise taxes, and service taxes.

Board of Commissioners: A three-member board of commissioners combines executive and non-fiscal legislative powers. Commissioners are elected county-wide, in staggered four-year terms. One commissioner serves as president. The commissioners also function as the county drainage board, exercising control over the construction and maintenance of legal drains.

Courts: DeKalb County has a Circuit Court (75th Judicial Circuit) and two Superior Courts. By local rule, approved by the Indiana Supreme Court, the jurisdiction of the Circuit Court is currently limited to juvenile and domestic cases. Criminal, civil and domestic cases are heard in the two superior courts. Judges of each court are elected for six-year terms on partisan tickets.

County Officials: The county has other elected offices, including sheriff, coroner, auditor, treasurer, recorder, surveyor, and circuit court clerk. Each officer is elected to a four-year term of four years and oversees a different part of county government. Members elected to county government positions are required to declare a party affiliation and to be residents of the county.

DeKalb County is part of Indiana's 3rd congressional district and in 2008 was represented by Mark Souder in the United States Congress. It is in Indiana Senate districts 13 and 14, and Indiana House of Representatives districts 51, 52 and 85.

Demographics

As of the 2010 United States Census, there were 42,223 people, 15,951 households, and 11,328 families in the county. The racial makeup of the county was 96.9% white, 0.5% Asian, 0.4% black or African American, 0.2% American Indian, 0.8% from other races, and 1.2% from two or more races. Those of Hispanic or Latino origin made up 2.4% of the population. In terms of ancestry, 36.3% were German, 10.9% were American, 10.8% were Irish, and 9.1% were English.

Of the 15,951 households, 35.2% had children under the age of 18 living with them, 54.8% were married couples living together, 10.5% had a female householder with no husband present, 29.0% were non-families, and 24.3% of all households were made up of individuals. The average household size was 2.61 and the average family size was 3.08. The median age was 38.1 years.

The median income for a household in the county was $47,697 and the median income for a family was $55,280. Males had a median income of $44,880 versus $30,663 for females. The per capita income for the county was $21,779. About 6.7% of families and 9.0% of the population were below the poverty line, including 11.3% of those under age 18 and 6.2% of those age 65 or over.

2020 census

Education

School districts

 DeKalb County Central United School District
 DeKalb County Eastern Community School District
 Garrett-Keyser-Butler Community School District
 Hamilton Community Schools

Private schools
 Lakewood Park Christian School
 St. Joseph's Catholic School (Garrett)
Trinity Lutheran Church Preschool
 Zion Lutheran Pre-School (Garrett)

See also
 National Register of Historic Places listings in DeKalb County, Indiana
 The Star, daily newspaper covering DeKalb County

References

External links

 DeKalb County Government
  Maumee Valley Heritage Corridor
 DeKalb County Visitors Bureau
 DeKalb County American History and Genealogy Project

 
Indiana counties
1837 establishments in Indiana
Populated places established in 1837
Fort Wayne, IN Metropolitan Statistical Area
Sundown towns in Indiana